Rumana or Roumana may refer to:

Rumana, Israel
Rumana, West Bank
Rumana Monzur, Bangladeshi woman studying in Canada who was blinded by her husband in an attempt to stop her education

See also
Ruman (disambiguation)
Rumman (disambiguation)